Robert Short is a makeup artist. He won at the 61st Academy Awards in the category of Best Makeup for his work on Beetlejuice. He shared his Oscar with Steve La Porte and Ve Neill.

In addition to doing makeup, he also does visuals, and has done some writing and producing as well.

Selected filmography

 Star Trek: The Motion Picture (1979)
 E.T. the Extra-Terrestrial (1982)
 Splash (1984)
 Beetlejuice (1988)
 Super Force (TV series) (1990–1992)
 Punisher: War Zone (2008)

References

External links

Best Makeup Academy Award winners
Living people
Make-up artists
Special effects people
Year of birth missing (living people)